La Fan, is an American telenovela produced by Telemundo, is a story written by Marcela Citterio and inspired by an idea of history Angélica Vale.

The story revolves around the life of a famous telenovelas actor and his faithful follower who is his number one fan.

The series stars Angélica Vale as Valentina, Juan Pablo Espinosa as Lucas, and Scarlet Ortiz as Salma.

On January 12, 2017, the first chapter of the telenovela was published with a duration of 20 minutes as a special before the premiere.

Plot summary 
Vale (Angélica Vale) is a cheerful, humble, simple woman, and a fanatic of a soap opera actor, the famous Lucas Duarte (Juan Pablo Espinosa). The lives of Vale and Lucas cross one day, by what they call destiny, luck or magic. While she is hidden inside a giant Pizza outfit, handing out flyers of the place where she works, she saves her beloved actor's life, but in reality, everything is part of one of the scenes of the telenovela. That is the first meeting between Lucas and Vale, but not the only one. Lucas's representative, Gabriel (Gabriel Porras), comes up with the idea of creating a contest for all his fans and after cheating a little, names Vale the winner. Vale, delighted, has lunch with him and ends up saving his life, now for real. After this Vale becomes his personal assistant and shadow, in other words, his guardian angel. Vale begins to know who Lucas Duarte really is (is hobbies, his defects) but even so, she loves him more and more. Lucas begins to realize who his real fan is...her strength, her light, her brilliance and, in spite of himself, he begins to fall in love with her. But like in every story, there is a dark past, a past that can transform their love into something impossible. Even though neither of them knows, Lucas is the father of Tomás (Emmanuel Perez), the son of Lucia, Vale's friend, who Vale has raised as if it were hers since her friend died. He is the man Vale hates for abandoning her friend. Vale is at a crossroads, she must decide whether to stand up for her deceased friend or to remain what she has always been: the fan.

Cast

Starring 
 Angélica Vale as Valentina Pérez
 Juan Pablo Espinosa as Lucas Duarte
 Miguel Varoni as Justin Case / El Director
 Scarlet Ortiz as Salma Beltrán
 Ximena Duque as Adriana Zubizarreta
 Jonathan Islas as Diego Castro
 Gabriel Porras as Gabriel Bustamante

Also starring 
 Omar Germenos as Carlos Zubizarreta 
 Gloria Peralta as Eloisa Romero
 Elsy Reyes as Felicitas
 Begoña Narváez as Jessica González
 Pablo Azar as Benicio Torres
 Gabriel Rossi as Miguel Castro
 Josette Vidal as Miriam del Carmen
 Ricardo Kleinbaum as Enrique Julio Gardiazabal / Quique
 Lorena de la Garza as Natalia
 Gabriel Valenzuela as Nicolás
 Silvana Arias as Bárbara Blanco
 Maritza Bustamante as Lucía Hernández / Úrsula Molina
 Mario Espitia as Agustín Peterlini
 Freddy Florez as Roberto Flores / Bob
 Roberto Plantier as Dr. Damián Arévalo
 Fernando Pacanins as Víctor Carrizo
 Lalo García as Rodrigo Gómez
 Emmanuel Pérez as Tomás Hernández

Special guest stars 
 Laura Flores as Paloma
 Daniel Elbittar as Leonardo Márquez / El Potro
 Catherine Siachoque as Isabel
 Lupita Ferrer as Silvia
 Jorge Luis Pila as El Tuerto
 Jesús Moré as Franco Villar
 David Chocarro as Ricardo Ernesto / Richard Ernestón
 Ligia Petit as Roxana
 Angélica María as Valentina Gardiazabal / Mamita
 Adamari López as Carmen Córdoba
 Wanda D'Isidoro as Guadalupe "Lupita"
 Laura Chimaras as Renata Izaguirre
 Eduardo Serrano as Pascual Blanco
 Sandra Destenave as Dolores "Lola" D'Alessandro
 Fabián Ríos as Guillermo "Willy" del Castillo
 Henry Zakka as Dr. Machado
 Fernanda Castillo as La Parka
 José Ramón Blanch as Rogelio Gutiérrez / La Bestia
 Carlos Ponce as Luis Alberto Fontan
 Jorge Bernal as Himself
 Ahrid Hannaley as Karina
 Dad Dáger as Patricia

Production 
The production of the telenovela was confirmed on July 5, 2016, and the production concluded on December 22, 2016. The production is mainly recorded in Miami, the first scenes were made in Los Angeles. Vale explained that the idea arose as she wanted to pay homage to all her fans and followers of the telenovela La fea más bella.

The series is an original idea written by Angélica Vale in 2009, which has a promotional video uploaded to YouTube that same year. The story is adapted by Marcela Citterio based on the idea of Angélica, is directed by Miguel Varoni, Claudio Callao and Otto Rodríguez and as executive producers Carmen Cecilia Urbaneja, José Gerardo Guillén and David Posada and as general producer Angélica Vale. Vale said that the series will have a bit of sitcom format.

Promotion 
The first advance of the telenovela was presenting during the event broadcast by Telemundo entitled, La Fiesta Latina de iHeart Radio. The telenovela was presented in Natpe the same day they finished the production.

Casting 
In May 2016 Angélica Vale confirmed her return to the telenovelas, after being 10 years away from the dramatic genre. On August 3, 2016, Vale confirmed the participation of Juan Pablo Espinosa as the protagonist of the story. Scarlet Ortiz was chosen as the main villain of the story, and marks the debut of the actress in the network Telemundo.Miguel Varoni who besides being the director of the telenovela, his character Justin Case will have the same role of Varoni in the production of the telenovela as it will be a character who works as director, also confirmed the participation of Catherine Siachoque in the production. Espinosa confirmed through his Instagram the participation of Adamari López in the telenovela, the actress and presenter who was 8 years away from the telenovelas.

Shows cancelled 
A total of 114 episodes were confirmed for series. Due to the low rating of primetime that had the series, Telemundo canceled the series, despite the number of cliffhangers, and only 54 episodes were programmed to be transmitted.

Ratings

Episodes 
The series premiered in Mexico at 2pm and had a total of 65 episodes, while in its original broadcast had 54 episodes.

Awards and nominations

References

External links 
 

Spanish-language American telenovelas
Telemundo telenovelas
American telenovelas
2017 telenovelas
2017 American television series debuts
2017 American television series endings